LVW may refer to:

 Longview station (station code LVW), Longview, Texas, USA; an Amtrak train station
 League of Victorian Wheelmen (LVW), a professional-cyclist bicycle federation in the Australian state of Victoria, predecessor of Cycling Victoria
 LiveWire (company) (NYSE stock ticker LVW), a U.S. electric motorcycle company
 "Landing Vehicle, Wheeled" (LVW), U.S. Navy designation for the DUKW ("Duck", Duplex Universal Carrier, Wheeled) amphibious truck
 Loaded vehicle weight (LVW): see automotive acronyms and abbreviations
 Left ventricle weight (LVW), in anatomy and medicine
 Lint voor Verwonding (LvW), South African campaign medal, for the First and Second Boer Wars

See also
 Glucose-1-phosphate thymidylyltransferase (PDB code: 1LVW)